Aggregator may refer to:
Job ads aggregator, a website that aggregates job ads from various job boards, multiposter sites, as well as from direct employers and recruiting agencies
News aggregator, software or a website that aggregates news from various sources
Poll aggregator, a website that aggregates polling data to gauge public sentiment on key political issues or to measure likely support for a candidate or party in an upcoming election.
Review aggregator, a website that aggregates reviews of movies or other products or services
Search aggregator, software that aggregates search results from various search engines
Social network aggregation, the collection of content from multiple social network services
Video aggregator, a website that aggregates online videos from various sources

See also
Aggregate (disambiguation)
Aggregation (disambiguation)
:Category:Aggregation-based digital libraries, digital libraries that are primarily based on aggregation or harvesting of other digital libraries or repositories